Skin is a soft outer covering of an animal, in particular a vertebrate.

Skin(s) or The Skin(s) may also refer to:

Outer covering
 Peel (fruit), or outer covering of any vegetable
 Skin (aeronautics), the outer covering of an aircraft or its wing
 Skinning, removing the outer layer of something's flesh
 Milk skin, a thin layer over the top of heated milk
 Hide (skin), an animal skin processed by humans
 Mobile phone skin, a protective and/or decorative covering for a mobile phone

Arts and entertainment

Film
 The Skin, a 1981 Italian film by Liliana Cavani
 Skin (1995 film), a British short film directed by Vincent O'Connell
 Skins (2002 film), an American drama film
 Skin (2008 film), a British-South African biographical film about Sandra Laing
 Skins (2017 film), a Spanish drama film
 Skin (2018 feature film), an American drama film by Guy Nattiv
 Skin (2018 short film), an American Oscar-winning drama film by Guy Nattiv
 Skin: The Movie (2018 film), an American comedy film by Ronn Kilby
 Skin (2020 film), an Iranian drama film

Literature

Novels
Skin (Andrew novel), a 2021 novel by Kerry Andrew
 Skin (Dekker novel), a 2007 novel by Ted Dekker
 Skin (Hayder novel), a 2009 novel by Mo Hayder
 Skin (graphic novel), a 1992 graphic novel by Peter Milligan and Brendan McCarthy
 Skin, an X-Files novel by Ben Mezrich
 The Skin, a 1949 novel by Curzio Malaparte
 Skins, a 1995 novel by Adrian C. Louis

Other
 "Skin" (short story), a 1952 short story by Roald Dahl
 Skin and Other Stories, a 2000 story collection by Roald Dahl
 Skin: Talking About Sex, Class & Literature, a 1994 collection of essays by Dorothy Allison
 Skin (Marvel Comics), a fictional character
 Skin, a 1995 play by Naomi Iizuka

Music

Performers 
 Skin (British band), a hard rock band, or their 1994 debut album
 Skin (Japanese band) or S.K.I.N, a rock supergroup
 Skin (musician) (born 1967), British singer, lead vocalist for Skunk Anansie
 The World of Skin, also known as Skin, an American band

Albums 
 Skin (16volt album) or the title song, 1994
 Skin (Endorphin album) or the title song, 1999
 Skin (Erik Friedlander album), 2000
 Skin (Flume album), 2016
 Skin: The Remixes, 2017
 Skin (Joy Crookes album), 2021
 Skin (Katie Noonan album), 2007
 Skin (Melissa Etheridge album), 2001
 Skin (Peter Hammill album) or the title song, 1986
 Skin (The Rainmakers album) or the title song, 1996
 Skins (Buffalo Tom album), 2011
 Skins (XXXTentacion album), 2018
 Skins! Bongo Party with Les Baxter, 1957
 Skin (EP), by Collide, 1996

Songs
 "Skin" (Breaking Benjamin song), 2003
 "Skin" (Rag'n'Bone Man song), 2017
 "Skin" (Rihanna song), 2010
 "Skin" (Sabrina Carpenter song), 2021
 "Skin (Sarabeth)", by Rascal Flatts, 2005
 "Skin", by Adema from the album Adema, 2001
 "Skin", by Alexz Johnson from Instant Star: Greatest Hits, 2009
 "Skin", by Beartooth from Below, 2018
 "Skin", by Bladee from Eversince, 2016
 "Skin", by Bullet for My Valentine from Venom, 2015
 "Skin", by Club 8 from Pleasure, 2015
 "Skin", by Collective Soul from Blender, 2000
 "Skin", by Flowers from Icehouse, 1980
 "Skin", by Grimes from Visions, 2012
 "Skin", by Mac Miller from The Divine Feminine, 2016
 "Skin", by Machinae Supremacy from Overworld, 2008
 "Skin", by Madonna from Ray of Light, 1998
 "Skin", by Oingo Boingo from Dark at the End of the Tunnel, 1990
 "Skin", by R. Kelly, 2008
 "Skin", by Rae Morris from Unguarded, 2015
 "Skin", by San Cisco from Flaws, 2020
 "Skin", by Spacey Jane from Sunlight, 2020
 "Skin", by Spock's Beard from Day for Night, 1999
 "Skin", by White Zombie from Let Sleeping Corpses Lie, 2008
 "Skin, No. 1" and "Skin, No. 2", by Julius Hemphill from Coon Bid'ness, 1975
 "Skins", by Pink Floyd from The Endless River, 2014
 "Skinz", by Pete Rock & CL Smooth from Mecca and the Soul Brother, 1992

Video games
 Skin, in video game terminology, a player customization option for the outward appearance of an item.

Television
 Skins (British TV series), a 2007–2013 teen drama series
 Skins (American TV series), an adaptation that aired on MTV in 2011
 Skin (American TV series), a 2003 drama series
 Skin (British TV programme), a 1980–1982 documentary programme
 "Skin" (Almost Human), an episode
 "Skin" (Supernatural), an episode
 Skin (Emmerdale), a character
 Skins, a species of aliens in Roswell
  Skin (2019 documentary), a documentary on perceptions of beauty based on skin color in Africa

Sports
 Skins (sportswear), a company that manufactures and sells compression sportswear
 Skins game, a type of golf and curling event
 Skins, the team that plays a sport shirtless in shirts versus skins
 Washington Commanders, formerly the Washington Redskins, sometimes shortened to Skins

Other uses
 Skin (anthropology), a form of social categorisation system in Australian Indigenous societies
 Skin (computing), a customized graphical presentation for computer software and websites
 Polaris Skin, an Italian ultralight trike design

See also
 
 
 Skinning (disambiguation)
 Skinny (disambiguation)